Svetlana Chmakova (b. October 7, 1979) is a Russian-Canadian comic book artist. She is best known for Dramacon, an original English-language (OEL) manga spanning three volumes and published in North America by Tokyopop. Her other original work includes Nightschool and Awkward for Yen Press.  She has been nominated for an Eisner Award twice.  Previously, she created The Adventures of CG for CosmoGIRL! magazine and the webcomic Chasing Rainbows for Girlamatic.

Early life and education
Chmakova was born in Russia where she was first exposed to comics after she found ElfQuest at a Moscow book stand. After she emigrated to Canada at the age of 16, she graduated from the Sheridan College Classical Animation program in 2002. She then began to publish her manga on the Internet.

Career

Dramacon is Chmakova's first full-length comic, telling the story of Christie Leroux, an aspiring teenage comics writer, and her experiences at her first anime convention. She attends the convention with her artist boyfriend Derek Hollman, but soon finds herself attracted to a mysterious, sun-glassed cosplayer named Matt Green.

Other works by Chmakova include The Adventures of CG for CosmoGIRL! magazine and the Chasing Rainbows and Night Silver webcomics.  Her art also appears in Mangaka America and Flight.

On February 24, 2007 at New York Comic Con, Yen Press announced that they would be publishing Nightschool, a new original manga by Chmakova.

At New York Comic Con on October 10, 2014, Yen Press announced that they would be publishing Awkward, a new original comic by Chmakova.  Brave, a sequel to Awkward, was announced on April 25, 2016.  Crush, the third book in the series, was released in 2017, and received the 2019 Excellence in Graphic Literature Award in the Middle Grade Category.On September 22, 2022, the next book in the series, Enemies, was released in the US and Canada

Critical reaction
The Atlanta Journal-Constitution described Dramacon as "surprisingly true-to-life (and occasionally harrowing) emotional drama and humor ... Creator Svetlana Chmakova doesn't skimp on character development or plot progression. Her art is top-notch as well, outstripping even many of her Japanese inspirations with clear storytelling and polished technique."Dramacon was nominated for an Eisner Award in 2007.Nightschool won the Dragon Award for Kids Comics at the Shuster Awards in 2010.Awkward was named as one of School Library Journal's Top 10 Graphic Novels of 2015.  It was also named by YALSA on their list of the 2016 Great Graphic Novels for Teens.  Amanda M. Vail of The Mary Sue said "it needs to be on the shelves of every school and public library."Awkward won the 2nd Annual Dwayne McDuffie Award for Kids' Comics, Dragon Award for Kids Comics at the 2016 Shuster Awards, and was nominated for an Eisner Award.Brave has received largely positive reviews by book critics. Good Comics for Kids, a blog hosted by School Library Journal called it "a surefire hit" with magnificent artwork. Brave was later named as one of the School Library Journal Top 10 Graphic Novels of 2017. It was also nominated to the YALSA list of the Great Graphic Novels for Teens, included on Amazon.com's list of Best Comics and Graphic Novels of 2017, and ICv2's Top 10 Kids Graphic Novels of 2017.
Brigid Alverson named it one of her top 10 graphic novels for kids in 2017.The Weirn Books: Be Wary of the Silent Woods was nominated for the 2021 Joe Shuster Awards.

Bibliography

References

 Memmott, Carol (July 6, 2005). "Japanese manga takes humongous step". USA TODAY'', Pg. 4D.
  Article about Chmakova

External links
Svetlana Chmakova's official site
Svetlana Chmakova's official Twitter
Publishers Weekly interview with Chmakova

Canadian comics artists
Russian women artists
Canadian female comics artists
Russian female comics artists
Canadian webcomic creators
1979 births
Living people
Sheridan College animation program alumni
Russian emigrants to Canada
Canadian women artists
Female comics writers